Mokum (מקום) is the Yiddish word for "place" or "safe haven". It is derived from the Hebrew word makom (מקום, "place").

In Yiddish, the names for some cities in the Netherlands and Germany were shortened to Mokum and had the first letter of the name of the city, transliterated into the Hebrew alphabet, added to them. Cities named this way were Amsterdam, Berlin, Delft, and Rotterdam.

Mokum, without Aleph, is still commonly used as a nickname in the Netherlands for the city of Amsterdam. The nickname was first considered to be  bargoens, a form of Dutch slang, but in the 20th century it lost its negative sound and is now used by Amsterdammers as a nickname for their city in a sentimental context. Examples are the song "Brand in Mokum" (derived from "Scotland's Burning"), Mokum 700, an exhibit in the RAI Amsterdam Convention Centre celebrating the 700th anniversary of Amsterdam in 1975, or "Mama Mokum", a song about Amsterdam by Ramses Shaffy from 1997.

References

Alternative place names
Culture in Amsterdam
Delft
Dutch words and phrases
Hebrew words and phrases
History of Amsterdam
History of Berlin
Mokum
Rotterdam
Yiddish culture in Germany
Yiddish culture in the Netherlands
Yiddish words and phrases